The Clarence "Big House" Gaines Award is an award given annually by CollegeInsider.com to the most outstanding men's college basketball head coach in NCAA Division II. The award was established in 2011 and is named for the late Clarence Gaines, who coached for 47 years at Winston-Salem State University.

Winners
 2011 – Steve Kinder, Humboldt State University
 2012 – Ben McCollum, Northwest Missouri
 2013 – Tom Billeter, Augustana University
 2014 – Jeff Wilson, East Stroudsburg
 2015 – Chad Walthall, Minnesota State–Moorhead
 2016 – Josh Schertz, Lincoln Memorial
 2017 – Darren Vorderbruegge, Hawaii Pacific
 2018 – Grady Brewer, Morehouse College
 2019 – Andre Cook, St. Edward's
 2020 – Ben McCollum (2), Northwest Missouri State
 2021 – Todd Duncan, Lubbock Christian

References

External links
 

Awards established in 2011
College basketball coach of the year awards in the United States
+